Coping Mechanisms may refer to:

 Coping Mechanisms (Si Schroeder album)
 Coping Mechanisms (Tayla Parx album)
 Coping mechanisms

See also
 Coping Mechanism (album)